Berzano di San Pietro is a comune (municipality) in the Province of Asti in the Italian region Piedmont, located about  east of Turin and about  northwest of Asti.

Berzano di San Pietro borders the following municipalities: Albugnano, Aramengo, Casalborgone, Cinzano, and Moncucco Torinese.

Twin towns
 Tașca, Romania
 Tetchea, Romania
 Glūda, Latvia
 Petritsi, Greece
 Kerkini, Greece
 Irakleia, Greece

References

Cities and towns in Piedmont